Jongert is a shipyard specialized in the building of sailing yachts, located in Wieringerwerf, Netherlands.

History 
Between 1970 and 1994 the yard exported cumulatively in excess of half a billion guilders worth of yachts. Most of the later vessels were designed by Tony Castro and built from steel or aluminium.

Jongert went bankrupt in 2009, then restarted under the ownership of VEKA. In 2015 the company went bankrupt again.

In 2016 the company is active.

On January 19, 2017, they announced they found a new investor, following the failed takeover of the yard by Acico. Together with the Vripack design studio they are working on a  motor yacht project.

List of yachts built

See also
 Tamer II
 Wellenreiter
 List of sailboat designers and manufacturers
 List of large sailing yachts

References

External links
 Jongert website

Vehicle manufacturing companies established in 1953
Dutch boat builders
Dutch brands
Sailing in the Netherlands
Economy of North Holland
Yacht building companies
1953 establishments in the Netherlands